Eloho Jocelyn Efemuai (née, Amata; born 20 July 1973) is a Nigerian and Scottish musician, who plays a style of urban contemporary gospel music. She has released two studio albums, Arise (2014) and Unrestrained (2016).

Early life and background
Efemuai was born, Eloho Jocelyn Efemuai, on 20 July 1973, the youngest daughter of Ifoghale Amata and Joy Omotoyinbo, the sister of Fred Amata and Zach Amata. Her nephew is Jeta Amata.

Music career
Her music recording career started in 2014, with the studio album, Arise, while it was released on 15 March 2014. She released, Unrestrained, the second studio album, on 29 July 2016. The single, "He's Alive", was released on her birthday, 20 July, on her YouTube channel.

Discography
Arise (15 March 2014)
Unrestrained (29 July 2016)

References

External links
 

1973 births
Living people
Scottish Christians
21st-century Nigerian women singers
Nigerian Christians
People from Aberdeen
Residents of Lagos
21st-century Scottish women singers